Lady Anne Catherine Dorothy Hill (née Gathorne-Hardy; 1911–2006) was a British bookseller and writer.

Life
She was born in 1911, the daughter of Gathorne Gathorne-Hardy, 3rd Earl of Cranbrook and Lady Dorothy Montagu Boyle.

In 1936, she started working with George Heywood Hill, and together they launched Heywood Hill, which still operates as an independent bookshop in the central London district of Mayfair. In 1938, the pair married; he was a cousin of her sister-in-law Fidelity Cranbrook (née Seebohm, second wife of the fourth Earl). She had previously been engaged to James Lees-Milne, an expert in English country houses, and they remained on good terms.

The Hills lived in Warwick Avenue, Maida Vale, and later in Richmond. They had two daughters.

Works
She researched her family tree and became intrigued by Captain Edward Trelawny, a friend of the poets Byron and Shelley. She published Trelawny's strange relations  in 1977. Her account of running the bookshop while her husband was away at war appeared in print as A Bookseller's War (1997), mainly composed of letters between the couple.

Family
Her brothers were John, 4th Earl of Cranbrook, booksellers Edward and Robert, and Anthony, whose son was the writer Jonathan Gathorne-Hardy.

References

1911 births
2006 deaths
British booksellers
Daughters of British earls
Businesspeople from London
20th-century English businesspeople